A1GP Powered by Ferrari car is a vehicle designed to compete in the A1 Grand Prix. The chassis is based on the Formula One Ferrari F2004 chassis. It is made from carbon-fibre skins with an aluminium honeycomb core, and has been tested to meet all FIA crash safety standards. Only 23 cars were ever made.

Design

History 
On October 11, 2007, A1GP and Ferrari announced a six-year collaboration on the new generation of A1GP cars. The new "Powered by Ferrari" car is a modification of the Formula One Ferrari F2004 chassis with a V8 Ferrari engine producing 600 bhp. The car was officially revealed in Southern England, and driven for the first time by John Watson in an inaugural event in May 2008. Michelin supplied the tyres for the new car.

Andrea Bertolini was the main test driver, but testing was carried out by Marc Gené, Patrick Friesacher, Jonny Kane and Danny Watts during the sessions at Silverstone Circuit.

On July 22, 2008, information regarding the then-new "Powered by Ferrari" A1GP car was revealed.

On August 2–3 2008, the first press and public presentation of this car was held on the TT Circuit Assen with former A1 Team Netherlands driver, Renger van der Zande. Two weeks after, the car was presented in Rotterdam during the Bavaria City Racing Festival. The A1 Team Netherlands car was driven by Carlo van Dam.

Pre-season tests of the new 'powered by Ferrari' car took place on consecutive weekends in September at Donington Park, Mugello and Snetterton.

It was only used for the 2008–2009 season as the series was cancelled for the next season.

PowerBoost
While the number of PowerBoost uses remain unchanged from Zytek era (4 times in Sprint races and 8 times in Feature races), a new rule for the season allowed drivers to use it for the entirety of a single lap during qualifying sessions.

Each car is equipped with a unique PowerBoost system, a mechanism to provide short bursts of increased power to create additional overtaking opportunities and action throughout the race.

The PowerBoost is driver-activated by a button mounted on the steering wheel. While the number of PowerBoost uses remain unchanged from Zytek era (4 times in Sprint races and 8 times in Feature races), a new rule for the season allowed drivers to use it for the entirety of a single lap during qualifying sessions.

Wheels and tyres
Michelin was contracted to be the exclusive tyre supplier for three seasons beginning with 2008–09 season. Only one season was completed under this contract as the series was cancelled afterwards. Wheel rims were supplied by OZ Racing.

Engine
The engine is built by Ferrari. It is a 4.5-litre Ferrari F136 V8 engine capable of delivering  in PowerBoost mode. The new engine weighs 160 kg, 40 kg more than the previously-used Zytek engines.

Configuration: 90 degree V8
Displacement:  
Width: 
Height: 
Length: 
Weight: 
Cylinder block: Die-cast aluminium alloy
Cylinder head: Sand-cast aluminium alloy
Valvetrain: 4 overhead camshafts, 4 valves per cylinder
Engine Management: Bosch MED 9.6
Injection:	Gasoline direct injection
Spark plugs: 	NGK
Fuel: Shell E10 102 RON
Max Torque: 
Max power: 
Max speed:

Technical Specifications

Weight:	Approx  including driver, race-ready (excluding fuel)
Front and rear suspension:	Double wishbone with pushrod operated coil-over damper units. Adjustable ride height, cambers and toe, adjustable anti-dive and anti-squat to optimize drive control
Anti-roll bar:	Multi-adjustable, quick-change front, and rear roll bars
Chassis:	Carbon fiber skins, aluminum honeycomb core. Tested to meet all applicable FIA crash safety standards
Bodywork:	Lightweight composite bodywork
Gearbox:	Six-speed longitudinal sequential. Gear selection via a Magneti Marelli semi-automatic paddle-shift system
Driveline:	Tripod jointed driveshafts
Brakes:	Brembo carbon discs, six-pot aluminum calipers
Dampers:	Penske VBP-45, two-way adjustable
Wheels:	Front 13” dia. X 12” Rear 13” dia. X 14”
Steering:	Titan angle drive bevel and two-pinion ratios
Steering wheel:  diameter carbon, with mounted LCD dash
Instrumentation and display: Magneti Marelli mounted display unit; Multi-channel logging facility for engineering analysis
Seat belt:	FIA approved Sabelt six-point safety harness
Fuel cell:	ATL fuel cell approximately  capacity and designed to take up to 50 percent ethanol
Clutch:	AP three-plate carbon/carbon with steel hub
Tyres:		Michelin control slick and treaded wet tires

References 

A1GP
Open wheel racing cars